Thierno Bah (born 5 October 1982 in Labé, Guinea) is a Guinean footballer who currently plays . Bah is a former Switzerland youth international and represented the Swiss under-21 team. He signed for Lausanne-Sport in January 2011 and left after a year and half at the end of the 2011–2012 season.

References

External links
 Career history at ASF
 
 

1982 births
Living people
Swiss men's footballers
Swiss people of Guinean descent
Guinean footballers
Association football defenders
Swiss Super League players
FC Lausanne-Sport players
Neuchâtel Xamax FCS players
Servette FC players
Al-Taawoun FC players
Guinean expatriate footballers
Expatriate footballers in Saudi Arabia
Switzerland under-21 international footballers
Guinea international footballers
2012 Africa Cup of Nations players
FC Meyrin players
Saudi Professional League players
UAE First Division League players
Khor Fakkan Sports Club players